is a Japanese singer and musician from Kanagawa Prefecture, Japan. Formerly signed with Victor Entertainment, he has his own independent label, Hit-o-ride Records.

Biography 
Isogai's father chose the name "Simon" because he was a fan of Simon & Garfunkel. During junior high school, he often listened to hard rock on Masanori Itō's Rock City (伊藤政則のROCK CITY Itō Masanori no Rock City) and other television programs.

Isogai started performing live shows around his hometown in 2002, and he released an independently created mini-album the following year. He did not have his major debut until November 22, 2006. On his first album, White Room, he self-produced nine of the eleven songs.

He also wrote the music and lyrics to the song "Himitsu" for Arashi's Kazunari Ninomiya.

Discography

Singles 
 Kimi wa Yukeru (君はゆける You Can Go) (November 22, 2006)
 Hatsukoi ni Sasagu Uta (初恋に捧ぐ歌 A Song Dedicated to my First Love) (September 26, 2007)
 Kaerimichi nite (帰り道にて On the Road Home) (January 16, 2008)

Albums 
 White Room (ホワイトルーム Howaito Rūmu) (February 20, 2008)

Associated acts 
 Mai Fukui (Asahi ha Good Day, Tatta Hitori no Mikata)
 Kara (Bye Bye Happy Days!, Winter Magic, Ima, Okuritai 'Arigatō, Orion)
 Kylee (Crazy for You)
 Naoto Inti Raymi (Boku ha Kimi ga, Naitetatte) 
 Kazunari Ninomiya (Himitsu)
 Dream (Darling)

External links 
  
 Simon Isogai on Victor Entertainment

References 

1983 births
Japanese male musicians
Living people
Musicians from Kanagawa Prefecture
Victor Entertainment artists
21st-century Japanese singers
21st-century Japanese male singers